Tanja Bogosavljević (born ; April 24, 1989) is a Serbian handballer playing in the Turkish Women's Handball Super League for Muratpaşa Bld. SK and the Serbia national team. The -tall sportswoman is playing in the back position.

She played for HC BMS Milenium in her country before she transferred to the Antalya-based team Muratpaşa Bld. SK in July 2015.

References

1989 births
Handball players from Belgrade
Serbian female handball players
Serbian expatriate sportspeople in Turkey
Expatriate handball players in Turkey
Muratpaşa Bld. SK (women's handball) players
Living people